Port Royal is the fourth album by German heavy metal band Running Wild. It expanded on the pirate theme introduced in their album Under Jolly Roger (1987) and established them as "pirate metal" in the metal community. The album takes its name from the location of Calico Jack's death.

In 2017, Loudwire ranked Port Royal as the 23rd-best power metal album of all time.

Songs 
"Uaschitschun" tells about the pollution of nature through a Native American's perspective. "Uaschitschun" is a word that the Native Americans used for white males; the nearest translation is "ghost". The ending words were originally spoken by filmmaker Alanis Obomsawin in 1972 and were probably inspired by a famous speech made by Chief Seattle to the whites when they came to buy the lands of Seattle.

A music video was made for "Conquistadores" which had some air play on MTV's Headbangers Ball. It is also the first to use a 5-string bass in a metal context.

"Warchild" is not the same song that appeared in the band's early demos.

"Calico Jack" is about an English pirate of the 18th century. He designed the skull-and-bones pirate flag that was later named the Jolly Roger, which gave the title to the previous album.

Track listing

Notes 
 The 1st press CD release has no barcode. There were two variants of the backcover, one with yellow and one with white Noise logo. SID codes refer to the French press which has the white Noise logo
 The Japanese CD release contains the 1987 album Under Jolly Roger

Personnel 
Rolf Kasparek – vocals, guitars
Majk Moti – guitars
Jens Becker – bass
Stefan Schwarzmann – drums

Production
Karl-Ulrich Walterbach – executive producer
Tom Steeler – engineering, mixing
Sebastian Krüger – artwork
Becker Derouet – artwork

References 

1988 albums
Running Wild (band) albums
Noise Records albums